Mary-Jo Wormell (born 1947), better known as Mary Lyons, was a popular British writer of 45 romance novels for Mills & Boon from 1983 to 2001.

Wormell, along with two other prolific Mills & Boon authors, launched Heartline Publishing on 14 February 2001. The publishing house was meant to fill the gap between Mills & Boon and mainstream fiction. The publishing house appears to have closed as the website is now defunct.

Wormell was a Conservative Party parliamentary candidate. She has been married three times.

Bibliography

Single novels
The Passionate Escape (1983)
Caribbean Confusion (1983)
Desire in the desert (1984)
Spanish serenade (1984)
Love's Tangled Web (1984)
Dangerous Stunt (1985)
No Other Love (1985)
Eclipse of the Heart (1985)
Mended Engagement (1985)
Escape from the Harem (1986)
Passionate Deception (1986)
Hay Fever (1987)
Stranger at Winterfloods (1988)
Hurricane! (1988)
Love in a Spin (1989)
No Surrender (1989)
Dark and Dangerous (1991)
Silver Lady (1991)
Double Fire (1992)
Something Old, Something New, Something Borrowed, Something Blue (1992)
Love Is the Key (1992)
Love's Revenge (1993)
It Started with a Kiss (1994)
The Yuletide Bride (1995)
Keeping Secrets (1995)
Mr. Loverman (1996)
Husband Not Included! (1997)
The Valentine Affair! (1997)
The Playboy's Baby (1999)
The Italian Seduction (2000)
Their Convenient Marriage (2000)

The Notting Hill Grooms trilogy multi-Author
2. Reform of the Playboy (1997)

Big Event Series multi-Author
Baby Included! (1998)

Society Weddings Series multi-Author
The Society Groom (1999)

Omnibus in collaboration
Desert Destinies (2001) (with Helen Brooks and Emma Darcy)

References and sources
Harlequin Enterprises Ltd's Website
BBC – Publishing for Love's Sake

External links
Mary Lyons's Webpage in Fantastic Fiction's Website

British romantic fiction writers
Living people
1947 births